Events in the year 2006 in Hong Kong.

Incumbents
 Chief Executive: Donald Tsang

Events

See also
 List of Hong Kong films of 2006

 
Years of the 21st century in Hong Kong
Hong Kong
Hong Kong